Firstenberg is a surname. Notable people with the surname include:

Arthur Firstenberg (born 1950), American author and activist
Jean Picker Firstenberg, American non-profit executive
Jonathan Firstenberg (born 1949), American television composer, music supervisor, producer and consultant
Sam Firstenberg (born 1950), Israeli-American film director